Sangal Esports is a professional esports organization founded in 2017 by Emre Ergül. The organization has teams competing in Counter-Strike: Global Offensive and Valorant. In September 2020, Sangal started a partnership with Kaspersky.

Rosters

Counter-Strike: Global Offensive

Valorant

References 

Counter-Strike teams
Esports teams established in 2017
Esports teams based in Turkey